Enterprise Railroad was a horse drawn rail business for moving freight and passengers in Charleston, South Carolina. It was established with an African American board of directors. Draymen protested that it would compete with their business. Control of the business was eventually taken over by whites. 

The business was chartered in 1870 and its rail lines built in 1874. Directors of the business included Reconstruction era legislators.

See also
Horsebus

References

Defunct South Carolina railroads
Railway companies established in 1870